The Pandia was an ancient state festival attested as having been held annually at Athens as early as the time of Demosthenes. Although little that is known of the Pandia is certain, it was probably a festival for Zeus, and was celebrated in the spring after the City Dionysia in the middle of the month of Elaphebolion (late March and early April).

Dates
The exact date of the Pandia has been much discussed. Demosthenes, speech Against Midias (21.8) has a meeting, during which the conduct of the City Dionysia was reviewed, being held after the Pandia. This places the Pandia, at least during the time of Demosthenes, after the City Dionysia. Some have seen an association between the Pandia and the full-moon, placing the celebration on 14 Elaphebolion.  But according to Pickard-Cambridge, Gould and Lewis, the association with the full-moon "can neither be affirmed nor rejected", and modern scholarship appears to favor the later dates of 16 or 17 Elaphebolion.

Rites
The derivation of the festival's name and exactly whom the festival may have honored have been the subject of considerable discussion. Zeus, the goddess Selene, Pandia, a daughter of Zeus and Selene, and Pandion, a mythical king, have all been seen as being possibly connected with the festival.

The name "Pandia" is associated with the goddess Selene, the Greek personification of the moon. Originally Pandia may have been an epithet of Selene, but by at least the time of the Homeric Hymn to Selene, Pandia ("all brightness") had become a daughter of Selene and Zeus, and Pandia Selene or Selene's daughter Pandia, have been offered as possible origins for the name of the festival.

Another mythological figure whose name has been suggested as a possible source for the name of the festival is Pandion, a legendary king of Athens who, as part of the tribal reforms of Cleisthenes at the end of the sixth century BC, became the eponymous hero of the Athenian tribe Pandionis. However some scholars think it is more likely that the hero derived his name from the festival as its legendary founder. An inscription dating from c. 386 BC, which refers to a decree of the tribe Pandionis, commending a "priest of Pandion"  for services performed at the Pandia, supports the notion of a link between Pandion and the festival.

While mentioning both Selene and Pandion in connection with the festival's name, Photius states that the festival was held for Zeus, and although according to Robert Parker this association with Zeus may only be "a probably correct etymological guess", many scholars are content to assign the festival to Zeus. It is also possible that more than one of these mythological figures were associated with the festival, and who the festival honored may have changed over time.

Pandia of Plotheia

A festival of the same name is attested for the deme Plotheia; what relationship if any this festival may have had with the Pandia of Athens is unknown.

See also
 Athenian festivals

Notes

References
 Anderson, Greg, The Athenian Experiment: Building an Imagined Political Community in Ancient Attica, 508-490 B.C., University of Michigan Press, 2003. .
 Bekker, Immanuel, Anecdota Graeca: Lexica Segueriana, Apud G.C. Nauckium, 1814.
 Burkert, Walter, Homo Necans: The Anthropology of Ancient Greek Sacrificial Ritual and Myth, University of California Press, 1983. .
 Canevaro, Mirko, The Documents in the Attic Orators: Laws and Decrees in the Public Speeches of the Demosthenic Corpus, Oxford University Press, 2013. .
 Cook, Arthur Bernard, Zeus: Zeus, God of the Bright Sky, Volume 1 of Zeus: A Study in Ancient Religion, Biblo and Tannen, 1914.
 Dillon, Matthew, Lynda Garland, Ancient Greece: Social and Historical Documents from Archaic Times to the Death of Alexander, Routledge, 2010. .
 Demosthenes. Demosthenes with an English translation by A. T. Murray, Ph.D., LL.D. Cambridge, MA, Harvard University Press; London, William Heinemann Ltd. 1939.
 Evelyn-White, Hugh, The Homeric Hymns and Homerica with an English Translation by Hugh G. Evelyn-White. Homeric Hymns. Cambridge, MA.,Harvard University Press; London, William Heinemann Ltd. 1914.
 Harding, Phillip, The Story of Athens: The Fragments of the Local Chronicles of Attika, Routledge, 2007. .
 Harris, Edward M., Demosthenes, Speeches 20-22, University of Texas Press, 2010. .
 Kearns, Emily, The Heroes of Attica (Bulletin Supplement 57), University of London Institute of Classical Studies 1989. .
 Mikalson, Jon D. (1975), The Sacred and Civil Calendar of the Athenian Year, Princeton University Press. .
 Mikalson, Jon D. (1977), "Religion in the Attic Demes". The American Journal of Philology (The Johns Hopkins University Press) 98 (4): 424–435.
 Parke, Herbert William, Festivals of the Athenians, Cornell University Press, 1977.
 Parker, Robert (1996), Athenian Religion: A History, Oxford University Press. .
 Parker, Robert (2005),  Polytheism and Society at Athens, Oxford University Press. .
 Pickard-Cambridge, Sir arthur W., John Gould and D. M. Lewis, The Dramatic Festivals of Athens Oxford University Press, USA; 2 edition (January 12, 1989). .
 Robertson, Noel (1991), "Myth, Ritual and Livelihood in Early Greece" in Ancient Economy in Mythology: East and West, ed. M. Silver (Savage, Md. 1991). .
 Robertson, Noel (1993), Festivals and Legends: The Formation of Greek Cities in the Light of Public Ritual, The University of Toronto Press.
 Robertson, Noel (1996), "Athena's Shrines and Festivals" in Worshipping Athena: Panathenaia and Parthenon, The University of Wisconsin Press.
 Roscher, Wilhelm Heinrich, Über Selene und Verwandtes, B. G. Teubner, Leizig 1890.
 Sourvinou-Inwood, Christiane, Tragedy and Athenian Religion, Lexington Books, 2003. .
 Smith, William; A Dictionary of Greek and Roman Antiquities. William Smith, LLD. William Wayte. G. E. Marindin. Albemarle Street, London. John Murray. 1890. Online version at the Perseus Digital Library.
 Willetts, R. F., Cretan Cults and Festivals, Greenwood Press, 1980. .

Festivals in ancient Athens
March observances
April observances